Ahmed Dakkeli (born 1936) is an Egyptian gymnast. He competed in eight events at the 1960 Summer Olympics.

References

1936 births
Living people
Egyptian male artistic gymnasts
Olympic gymnasts of Egypt
Gymnasts at the 1960 Summer Olympics
Sportspeople from Cairo
20th-century Egyptian people